The Macon Coliseum is a multi-purpose arena in Macon, Georgia, United States. It is home to the Macon Mayhem, a minor-league hockey team in the Southern Professional Hockey League. The Centerplex was home to the Macon Whoopee (ECHL), Macon Whoopee (CHL) and Macon Trax ice hockey teams and the Macon Knights arena football team. It seats 7,182 for hockey and arena football and up to 9,252 for concerts.

History
Macon Centreplex was built in 1968 as the first facility of its size and kind in the state. Mayor Ronnie Thompson was among its most influential backers. Thompson, who served from 1967 to 1975, blocked an appearance at the facility by the boxer Muhammad Ali because the mayor objected to Ali's Conscientious Objector status during the Vietnam War.

The Centreplex quickly became Central Georgia's premier sports, entertainment and trade show venue, with concerts by well-known performers such as Elvis Presley. Presley performed at the centreplex on April 15, 1972, afternoon show and evening show, April 24, 1975, August 31, 1976, and June 1, 1977. Many others have performed here, including Led Zeppelin, the Allman Brothers Band, KISS, Van Halen, Jethro Tull, James Brown, War, Jackson 5, Jeffrey Osborne, Earth, Wind, and Fire, The Emotions, Bar Kays, Parliament/Funkadelic, The Temptations, OJays, Chicago, Leon Russell, Aerosmith, Rick James, Prince, The Time, Vanity 6, George Jones, Reba McEntire, Kenny Rogers, Hank Williams Jr., Red Hot Chili Peppers, Sarah McLachlan, Billy Joel, Katy Perry, Elton John and many others. R.E.M. filmed part of its first concert film Tourfilm here on November 11, 1989.

Professional wrestling often comes to the Centreplex. World Championship Wrestling (WCW) was a frequent visitor of the Centreplex, holding multiple television tapings and non-televised house shows all throughout the 90s. WCW's supercard Clash of the Champions XXI aired live from the Centreplex on TBS on November 18, 1992. The show featured Ricky Steamboat & Shane Douglas winning the unified WCW World Tag Team Championship and NWA World Tag Team Championship from Barry Windham & Dustin Rhodes. Windham turned heel on Rhodes after the match.

WCW Monday Nitro, WCW's flagship weekly live television show that aired on TNT, emanated from the Centreplex a few times:

— November 20, 1995 (notable for featuring the very first one-on-one match in history between Hulk Hogan and Sting)

— May 27, 1996 (notable for being the first two-hour episode of the show and Scott Hall's debut in WCW, beginning the New World Order storyline)

— December 23, 1996

— June 23, 1997

— December 22, 1997 (notable for being the first and only episode of "nWo Monday Nitro")

WWE also visits the Centreplex. On January 28, 1991, the company (then called the World Wrestling Federation or "WWF") held their 5th and final episode of The Main Event V, which aired nationally on NBC on February 1, 1991. The show featured the announcement that Hulk Hogan would face WWF Champion Sgt. Slaughter at WrestleMania VII for the title. The WWF also taped matches and segments for their syndicated shows, which featured the debut of Paul Bearer as the manager of The Undertaker. Their flagship weekly live television show, Monday Night Raw, aired live from the Centreplex on February 20, 1995, and featured the return of Sycho Sid to the WWF for the first time in almost 3 years. The following two episodes on February 27, 1995, and March 6, 1995, also featured taped matches from the Centreplex. As of 2017, WWE still holds house shows in the Centreplex about twice a year.

Impact Wrestling (formerly known as Total Nonstop Action) also held a television taping for their weekly flagship show, Impact Wrestling, on October 27, 2011, at the Centreplex. The shows aired on Spike on November 3, 2011, and November 10, 2011.

The arena underwent major renovations in 1996 including the addition of the Edgar H. Wilson Convention Centre, which hosts conventions, trade shows and banquets.  Three luxury suites were added in 2003 and the Centreplex's exterior redone, resulting in the addition of a giant "M" at the main entrance on the arena.

In fiction 
The Macon Coliseum was used to stand for La halle de glace Olympique in Albertville and the CC Amfi in Hamar in the film I, Tonya.

References

External links
Official website

Indoor arenas in Georgia (U.S. state)
Indoor ice hockey venues in the United States
Sports venues in Georgia (U.S. state)
Buildings and structures in Macon, Georgia
Tourist attractions in Macon, Georgia
Mercer Bears basketball
1968 establishments in Georgia (U.S. state)
Sports in Macon, Georgia
Basketball venues in Georgia (U.S. state)
Sports venues completed in 1968